Stephen John Oliver  (born 7 January 1948) was the Anglican area Bishop of Stepney from 2003 to 2010.

Oliver was trained for the priesthood at King's College London, spending his final year at St Augustine's College, Canterbury before a curacy at Clifton, Nottingham. After an incumbency at St Mary Plumtree in the same diocese he became head of religious programming at the BBC. From 1997 until 2003 he was a Canon Residentiary at St Paul's Cathedral, London before his appointment as the area Bishop of Stepney following John Sentamu's appointment as Bishop of Birmingham. Oliver retired on 6 July 2010.
In March 2013 'Inside Grief'  edited by Oliver was published by SPCK.

Styles
 The Reverend Stephen Oliver (1971–1997)
 The Reverend Canon Stephen Oliver (1997–2003)
 The Right Reverend Stephen Oliver (2003–present)

References

1948 births
Living people
Alumni of the Theological Department of King's College London
Associates of King's College London
Alumni of St Augustine's College, Canterbury
Bishops of Stepney
21st-century Church of England bishops